Get Wild is the début solo album by Iranian-American house DJ Sharam, one half of the Grammy award-winning DJ/production duo, Deep Dish; released on the February 17, 2009 through Ultra Records. The album was led by the single “She Came Along” featuring vocals from American singer and rapper Kid Cudi.

Track listing

Limited collectors edition

References 

2009 debut albums
Sharam albums